Horná Seč is a village and municipality in the Levice District in the Nitra Region of Slovakia.

History
In historical records the village was first mentioned in 1355.

Geography
The village lies at an altitude of 158 metres and covers an area of 8.303 km². It has a population of about 490 people.

Ethnicity
The village is approximately 75% Slovak, 23% Magyar and 2% Czech.

Facilities
The village has a public library and a football pitch.

Genealogical resources

The records for genealogical research are available at the state archive "Statny Archiv in Nitra, Slovakia"

 Roman Catholic church records (births/marriages/deaths): 1726-1771 (parish B)
 Lutheran church records (births/marriages/deaths): 1845-1898 (parish B)
 Reformated church records (births/marriages/deaths): 1827-1945 (parish B)

See also
 List of municipalities and towns in Slovakia

External links

https://web.archive.org/web/20080111223415/http://www.statistics.sk/mosmis/eng/run.html
Surnames of living people in Horna Sec

Villages and municipalities in Levice District